Charles William Ergen (born March 1, 1953) is an American billionaire businessman. He is co-founder and chairman of Dish Network and EchoStar. He stepped down as CEO of Dish in May 2011 in favor of Joseph Clayton. Ergen resumed as CEO upon Clayton's March 2015 retirement and was CEO until December 2017, when he promoted president and COO Erik Carlson to CEO, but remains as chairman. Reuters reported that the move was effected to remove the day-to-day responsibilities of running DISH and provide more time for Ergen to build out the company's emerging wireless business. Ergen owns 48 percent of Dish and 46 percent of Echostar shares. He holds 78 percent of Dish's and 72 percent of EchoStar's total voting power.

Early career
After graduating with an M.B.A. from Wake Forest in 1976, Ergen worked as a financial analyst for Frito-Lay. He "retired" in 1978 in hopes of working for himself. Afterward, he was a professional gambler, playing poker and blackjack.

EchoStar 

In 1980 Ergen, his future wife Candy, and Jim DeFranco started a new business called EchoSphere Corporation, investing $60,000 to purchase two C-Band antennas, targeting rural Colorado. They drove around the Denver metro area on a small budget, selling satellite dishes from the back of their truck.

In 1990 Ergen elevated EchoStar's profile by raising $335 million in junk bonds and purchasing orbital slots for satellites. Two years later, EchoStar got a DBS license from the Federal Communications Commission, giving the company its own geostationary orbital slot. In 1993, EchoStar Communications was incorporated. Under Ergen, EchoStar's net income doubled to $20.4 million, in 1993.

Dish 

Under Ergen, Dish was the first satellite television provider to offer two-way high-speed internet access as an investor in and dealer for StarBand Communications' geostationary Ku-band satellite internet access service in the United States and the first to introduce a Digital video recorder in a set-top box. He was also instrumental in making satellite receivers available for under $200. In 2012, the Big Four Broadcasters, NBC, CBS, ABC and Fox filed a suit against Dish after it launched AutoHop, a technology that records broadcasting programming and plays it back without commercials. Dish filed a suit seeking a declaratory judgment asserting the legality of the judgment. Preliminary injunction by Fox to block the service was denied. Ergen has stated that Dish's present focus is on acquiring a significant share of the spectrum for cellular wireless services. Dish is also looking for a partner to build a wireless network, with Google and AT&T speculated to be potential partners.

Under Ergen, EchoStar and Dish Network acquired multiple companies, after an $8 million deal for 22 channel assignments of DBSC.

Litigation
Various lawsuits in which Ergen has been involved include:

 In 2013 and 2014, Harbinger Capital Partners, a hedge fund managed by Philip Falcone, sued Dish Network and Charles Ergen personally in federal court in New York City, alleging racketeering and claiming that Dish Network had illegally tried to take away the hedge fund's control over LightSquared Inc. during its bankruptcy. In 2015, the federal court dismissed the suit.
 The Iron Workers Mid-South Pension Fund filed suit against Ergen in federal court in Colorado in September 2013. Ergen bought large amounts of LightSquared's debt at deep discounts while it was in bankruptcy. Ergen then made a personal bid of $2 billion to acquire LightSquared's assets. This increased the price that Dish had to bid in order to acquire LightSquared's rights to wireless spectrum. Indeed, Ergen ordered Dish to bid $2.2 billion on these assets. The suit claims this was a breach of Ergen's fiduciary duties to Dish shareholders. Dish and Ergen prevailed in the litigation.
 In 2005, a discrimination lawsuit was filed against EchoStar in federal court in Denver by an employee who said that EchoStar had engaged in "hostile conduct" against her after she had a baby in 2001. The lawsuit was settled for an undisclosed amount in August 2005.

Personal life
Ergen was born into an Episcopalian family in Oak Ridge, Tennessee, on March 1, 1953, the fourth of five children born to Viola (née Siebenthal) and William Krasny Ergen. His mother was one of the first female accountants in the state of Minnesota. His father was an Austrian immigrant who was working in Sweden as a nuclear physicist, and left Europe prior to World War II. His father coined the phrase "China Syndrome". His parents married in Minnesota in 1944 and then moved to Camden, New Jersey, before settling in Oak Ridge where his father accepted a position at the Oak Ridge National Laboratory. Ergen received a Bachelor of Arts from the University of Tennessee at Knoxville, where he was a member of Phi Gamma Delta fraternity. and an M.B.A. from Wake Forest University. He was a professional blackjack and poker player.

Ergen is well known for his frugality. His office is furnished with second-hand couches and he does not fly first class. Ergen used to sign all the checks his company issued but currently signs only checks for $100,000 or more. Ergen's supporters call his negotiating style patient and prudent.

He is married to Cantey ("Candy") McAdam. They have five children. They live in The Village at Castle Pines, Colorado.

Recognition 
Ergen was recognized with a Rocky Mountain News' Business Person of the Year Award in 1996, and honoured a second time in 2001.

Ergen co-founded the Satellite Broadcasting and Communications Association. In 2012, Ergen was inducted into the Consumer Electronics Hall of Fame.

References

External links

1953 births
Living people
American billionaires
Episcopalians from Tennessee
American people of Austrian descent
American chief executives
American mass media owners
Dish Network
People from Oak Ridge, Tennessee
University of Tennessee alumni
Wake Forest University alumni
Giving Pledgers
21st-century philanthropists